Beatrice Van (born Beatrice Abbott; August 8, 1890 – July 4, 1983) was an American silent film actress. She was also a screenwriter for both silent and sound films.

Biography 
Beatrice was born to Joseph and Beatrice Abbott in Omaha, Nebraska; she had an older sister, Genevieve. She grew up in Nebraska and Oklahoma, where she was educated in a convent. Beatrice's first marriage was to Cornelius Vander-Pluym; they had one child together, Kreigh Vander-Pluym, in 1912. The pair eventually divorced in 1915.

She was a leading woman at Universal for a time in the 1910s, and later worked as a scenarist for FBO. Beatrice married writer-actor James Gruen in 1927, and later, an Australian national, Charles Collman.

Filmography

Actress

 The Saint and the Singer (1914)
 One of the Finest (1914)
 Such a Villain (1914)
 The Hills of Silence (1914)
 The Awakening (1914/I)
 Lost by a Hair (1914)
 The Barnstormers (1914)
 This Is the Life (1914/III)
 Helping Mother (1914)
 Her Bounty (1914) as Bessie Clay
 Her Life's Story (1914) as The Wife
 The Senator's Lady (1914)
 The Vagabond (1914)
 Traffic in Babies (1914)
 Lights and Shadows (1914)
 The Heart of a Magdalene (1914)
 The Magic Mirror (1915)
 Changed Lives (1915)
 The Black Box (1915) as Ashleigh's daughter
 The Nightmare of a Movie Fan (1915)
 The Soul of the Vase (1915) as Wife
 A Woman Scorned (1915)
 Detective Blinn (1915)
 The Great Ruby Mystery (1915)
 The Mighty Hold (1915)
 The Girl from His Town (1915) as Duchess of Breakwater
 Love and Labor (1915)
 What's in a Name? (1915)
 Uncle Heck, by Heck! (1915)
 A Bully Affair (1915/I)
 When His Dough Was Cake (1915)
 A Friend in Need (1915)
 Mixed Males (1915)
 The End of the Road (1915)
 Almost a Widow (1915)
 The Wraith of Haddon Towers (1916)
 The Hills of Glory (1916)
 The First Quarrel (1916)
 Inherited Passions (1916)
 The Pearl of Paradise (1916) as Denise, his fiancée
 Told at Twilight (1917) as The Mother
 Hands Up! (1917) as Elinor Craig
 Who Was the Other Man? (1917) as Wanda Bartell
 Flirting with Death (1917)
 A Devil with the Wimmin (1917)
 My Unmarried Wife (1918)
 Painted Lips (1918) as Mrs. Silver
 There Goes the Bride (1918)
 Good Night, Paul (1918) as Rose Hartley
 The Tiger Lily (1919) as Dorothy Van Rensselaer
 The Dangerous Talent (1920) as Mildred Shedd

Writer

 A Small Town Girl (1915) (scenario)
 Miss Jackie of the Army (1917) (story)
 Molly Go Get 'Em (1918) (scenario)
 Jilted Janet (1918) (story)
 Ann's Finish (1918) (story)
 Penny of Top Hill Trail (1921)
 Eden and Return (1921)
 Boy Crazy (1922) (story)
 The Understudy (1922)
 Their First Vacation (1922) (scenario)
 Crashin' Thru (1923) (adaptation)
 The Fast Worker (1924)
 Any Woman (1925)
 California Straight Ahead (1925)
 A Knight Before Christmas (1926) (scenario)
 A Trip to Chinatown (1926)
 Along Came Auntie (1926)
 Raggedy Rose (1926)
 Blisters Under the Skin (1927) (scenario)
 Beware of Widows (1927)
 Silk Stockings (1927)
 The Irresistible Lover (1927)
 Companionate Marriage (1928)
 Thanks for the Buggy Ride (1928)
 Finders Keepers (1928)
 Good Morning, Judge (1928)
 Sinner's Parade (1928) (also adaptation)
 Modern Love (1929) (also story)
 No, No, Nanette (1930) (dialogue)
 Take the Heir (1930)
 He Loved Her Not (1931)
 Take 'em and Shake 'em (1931)
 Easy to Get (1931)
 Only Men Wanted (1932)
 Gigolettes (1932)
 Night of Terror (1933)

References

External links

American silent film actresses
Actresses from Nebraska
1890 births
1983 deaths
American women screenwriters
20th-century American actresses
Screenwriters from Nebraska
Silent film screenwriters
20th-century American women writers
20th-century American screenwriters